Graph cut may refer to:

Cut (graph theory), in mathematics
Graph cut optimization
Graph cuts in computer vision